Michael O'Reilly may refer to:
Michael O'Reilly (hunger striker), Irish revolutionary and one of the longest hunger strikers in history
Michael O'Reilly (boxer) (born 1993), Irish boxer
Michael O'Reilly (prelate) (died 1758), Irish bishop of Derry
Michael O'Reilly (runner), English long-distance runner and winner of the 1992 Japan Marathon Championships
Michael O'Reilly (voice actor), Canadian voice actor in Young Robin Hood and other animated series
Michael O'Rielly, U.S. Federal Communications Commissioner